Aphomia murciella is a species of snout moth in the genus Aphomia. It was described by Zerny in 1914, and is known from Spain.

The length of the forewings is 9–10 mm.

References

Moths described in 1914
Tirathabini
Moths of Europe